The 1971–72 season was the second and last season of the Local League of Iranian football. The competition was won by Persepolis Football Club of Tehran.

Qualifying Tournament – Region A

Group A

Group B

Semifinals

Final 

(P) Taj Tehran and Taj Noshahr Promoted to the Group stage

Third place play-off

Qualifying Tournament – Region B

Group A

Group B

Semifinals

Final 

(P) Taj Masjed Soleyman and Persepolis Promoted to the Group stage

Third place play-off

Qualifying Tournament – Region C

Group A

Group B

Semifinals

Final 

(P) Pas Tehran and Sepahan Promoted to the Group stage.

Third place play-off

Qualifying Tournament – Region D

Group A

Group B

Semifinals

Final 

(P) Jam Abadan and Oghab Tehran Promoted to the Group stage.

Third place play-off

Final round

Top goalscorers

References

Iran
1971–72 in Iranian football